Cabot House is one of twelve undergraduate residential Houses at Harvard University. Cabot House derives from the merger in 1970 of Radcliffe College's South and East House, which took the name South House (also known as "SoHo"), until the name was changed and the House reincorporated in 1984 to honor Harvard benefactors Thomas Cabot and Virginia Cabot. The house is composed of six buildings surrounding Radcliffe Quadrangle; in order of construction, they are Bertram Hall (1901), Eliot Hall (1906), Whitman Hall (1911), Barnard Hall (1912), Briggs Hall (1923), and Cabot Hall (1937). All six of these structures were originally women-only Radcliffe College dormitories until they were integrated in 1970. Along with Currier House and Pforzheimer House, Cabot is part of the Radcliffe Quad.

, the Faculty Deans of Cabot House are Ian Miller and Crate Herbert. Prior Masters include then-Radcliffe President Mary Bunting and New Republic publisher Martin Peretz.

History

Great experiment
In 1970, Harvard and Radcliffe began experimenting with co-educational housing. 150 Harvard students from the River Houses (including former Dean of Harvard College Benedict Gross) switched places with 150 Radcliffe students from the Quadrangle. Ten years later the experiment was taken to its logical conclusion, as the last all-male dorm, Straus Hall in Harvard Yard, went co-ed. Today, all Harvard dormitories, including the three Houses of the Quadrangle, house both men and women.

Birth of Cabot House
In 1961 Radcliffe College began to organize the brick buildings of the Radcliffe Quad into residential colleges in the style of Harvard. These Houses were styled North, South, and East, in reference to the cardinal directions of the building clusters.

Cabot House (originally named South House) was formed in 1970 when East House and the original South House were merged. Anna Maria Abernathy held the title of Head of House, and she and her husband Fred served as Cabot’s first House Masters (now Faculty Dean). In 1971, Mary Bunting, President of Radcliffe, began her tenure as House Master.

Bertram Hall, Radcliffe’s first permanent dormitory, was built in 1901 and donated by Mrs. David Pulsifer Kimball in memory of her son. In 1906, Eliot Hall, also donated by Mrs. Kimball, was built in honor of Grace Hopkinson Eliot, wife of Harvard President Charles W. Eliot. Alexander Wadsworth Longfellow, Jr, designed both Bertram and Eliot Halls. Barnard Hall was built in 1912 and named for Augusta Barnard and her husband. Briggs Hall, named for Radcliffe’s second president, LeBaron Russell Briggs, was constructed in 1923, and Cabot Hall, named in honor of Ella Lyman Cabot, member of the Radcliffe Governing Board from 1902 to 1934, followed in 1937. The sixth building, Whitman Hall, was completed in 1911 and named for Sarah Wyman Whitman, the creator of two of the stained glass windows in Memorial Hall and a member of the Radcliffe Governing Board for several years. The Faculty Deans’ residence is located at 107 Walker Street. A residential wood-frame house at 103 Walker Street is the Senior Tutor’s residence.

While the outside of the brick dormitories has remained unchanged, renovations to the House 19 years ago and to the dining area in the summer of 2002 provide new facilities and newly configured suites more in line with the "vertical hallway" arrangements of the River dormitories.

Shield
The Cabot House shield was adopted when South House became Cabot House, in 1984. The shield is the coat of arms used by the Boston Brahmin Cabots after whom the House is named, though, the shield is not their heraldic achievement; the coat of arms actually belongs to the French family Chabot, to whom the Boston Cabots have no relation.

Cabotoix have a unique affection for their shield, its red fish in particular. They are the inspiration for the common House cheer, "Go Fish!"—a play on the popular card game. Cabotoix feature their coat of arms on various apparel, including polo shirts, rugby shirts, and hooded sweatshirts. The standard coloration is used, or its inverse.

The House Office also has an antique copy of the Cabot Shield which had been hanging in the dining hall before the renovations. Oddly, this shield's colors are drastically different, although the shield still features the same general design and motto: the field is black and the perch are silver, and the crest is a white scallop shell. While the origin of this scheme is unknown, these colors are identical to those of Trumbull College, Cabot's sister college at Yale.

The standard arms are described heraldically as follows: Or, three chabots, haurient, gules. Crest: an escallop, or.

Motto
The Cabot family motto is 'Semper Cor,' meaning 'Always Heart'; this motto is shared by Cabot House.

Colors
The House colors, red and gold, are derived from the House shield; black, one of Radcliffe's colors, is an unofficial color, featured in much House apparel.

Community and traditions

Dining Hall
Cabot's Dining Hall is very different from those at the River. Unlike other House Dining Halls, Cabot's is not enormous, paneled in mahogany and decorated with oil paintings, marble busts, and medieval tapestries. The dining hall—completed during the 1987 renovations of the Quad, replacing what is now the JCR as the House's cafeteria—is an intimate and bright space. Located beneath the Moors Hall (Pforzheimer House) terrace, the three-tiered room is painted white, its floors carpeted; as the long wall facing the Quad is almost entirely glass, it is bathed in natural light throughout the day. The servery likewise is bright and airy, with knotty pine walls and earthenware tile floors. It is one of the most recently renovated House serveries, completed in 2002.

More than serving merely as the House cafeteria, the Dining Hall is the center of House activity. Aside from being the site of hours-long, social dinners, each evening the Dining Hall fills with students who work together on problem sets and projects for various subjects.

Stein Club
Cabot House Stein Club is the Junior Common Room beer-appreciation society to which every member of the Junior Common Room (that is, all House residents) automatically belongs. Every other Thursday evening throughout the school year, Stein Club meets in one of Cabot's six Living Rooms, usually in Briggs or Barnard Hall, or in the dining hall. At each meeting, students socialize over various types of ale, purchased by the House Committee. Each year, ceramic steins are ordered which bear the House insignia and the name of the owner. Stein Club attendance is very high in Cabot; tutors and the Faculty Dean are also known to attend for a beer and fraternization.

Cabot Café
Cabot Café is a coffee shop located in Cabot House at Harvard University. It is the only House with a coffee shop that is completely student run and operated. The Café offers coffee, espresso drinks, hot chocolate, tea, chai, cookies, and more. Cabot Café serves as a venue for student performers and other on-campus events. Since opening in September 2011, Cabot Café has become a social space on campus, with students trekking from all the other Houses to hang out with friends or study.

Cabot House Theatre Board
The Cabot House Theatre Board manages the Cabot Theatre. The theater traces its roots back to the Cabot Experimental Theater in the 1960s. Every year, the Theatre Board puts on a student-run musical. The 2019 musical was Footloose (musical).

Intramural sports
Cabot fields a strong intramural sports squad each year. Cabot holds the record for most consecutive Straus Cups (awarded to the House with the most intramural points accrued during the school year) with seven wins between 1994 and 2001.

Dutch Auction
To raise money for student events, the House Committee holds a Dutch Auction each spring. Students and tutors can offer a service or object to be auctioned. In past years, students have offered to write theme songs for individual House members, to clean rooms, to go on a date, and so on; Cabot alum Rivers Cuomo donated an autographed copy of Weezer's new album during his senior year.

The Auctioneer for the Dutch Auction is usually a prominent member of the House or the House Committee. Dutch Auctions are known for being wild events, with heated bidding wars and drunken revelry.

Festivus
A newly adopted tradition popularized by Seinfeld, Festivus is a very popular dinner during the month of December featuring cuisine from a multitude of cultures around the globe.

Faculty Deans, Resident Dean, Tutors, and Staff
, the Cabot Faculty Deans are Ian Miller and Crate Herbert. Miller is a professor of History and Herbert is the Vice President for Institutional Advancement at Wentworth Institute of Technology. 

Previous Faculty Deans (then known as House Masters) have included Rakesh Khurana, Dean of Harvard College, Jay M. Harris, Dean of Undergraduate Education and Wolfson Professor of Jewish Studies; Jim Ware, Frederick Mosteller Professor of Biostatistics; Jurij Striedter, Curt Hugo Reisinger Professor of Slavic Languages and Literatures; and Rulan Chao Pian, Professor of Music and East Asian Languages and Civilizations, the first non-white House Master in Harvard's history.

Allston Burr Resident Dean Ken Thomas began serving as Resident Dean in 2021. 

Resident Tutors are academicians and/or professionals who live in the House and provide academic, career and life guidance to House residents while undertaking further studies, research and professional ventures.  Resident Tutors at Cabot House have included:

Constituent halls

Cabot House comprises the following six halls:

 Cabot Hall
 Whitman Hall
 Briggs Hall
 Barnard Hall
 Bertram Hall
 Eliot Hall

Cabot, Whitman, Briggs and Barnard are connected by a series of tunnels in the basement.  The Dining Hall, JCR, and Grand Entry also serve to connect these buildings above ground.  Bertram and Eliot Halls, the oldest, are not connected to the rest of the house, but are a short distance away, co-located on the Radcliffe Quadrangle.  The Faculty Deans' Residence and Resident Dean's Residence, 107 and 103 Walker Street, respectively, are located directly across the street from the rest of the house, and are the only such residences in the Harvard House system not to be physically connected to the rest of the house.

Notable alumni

Lindsay Crouse, actress
Ellen Goodman, journalist

References

External links

 Cabot House official site

Harvard Houses
Radcliffe College and Institute